Plant health includes the protection of plants, as well as scientific and regulatory frameworks for controlling plant pests or pathogens. Plant health is concerned with:

Ecosystem health with a special focus on plants
Tree health
The control of plant pests
The control of plant pathology

See also
Plant disease forecasting, predicting the occurrence or change in severity of plant diseases
Animal and Plant Health Inspection Service
American Phytopathological Society
Plant Protection and Quarantine
Agreement on the Application of Sanitary and Phytosanitary Measures
Global Plant Clinic
Medicinal plants

References

Botany
Ecology